Taghrud (also Romanized as Ţaghrūd, Tagharūd, Tah Rūd, Tājrūd, Ţaqrūd, Tegārūd, Toghrood, and Ţoghrūd) is a village in Jafarabad Rural District, Jafarabad District, Qom County, Qom Province, Iran. At the 2006 census, its population was 438, in 125 families.

References 

Populated places in Qom Province